Alister Forrest McClelland Boyd (27 July 1935 – 28 August 2010) was a rugby union player who represented Australia.

Boyd, a wing, was born in Southport, Queensland and claimed 1 international rugby cap for Australia.

References

Australian rugby union players
Australia international rugby union players
1935 births
2010 deaths
Rugby union players from Queensland
Rugby union wings